The mixed NOC team relay in short track speed skating at the 2020 Winter Youth Olympics was held on 22 January at the Lausanne Skating Arena.

Results

Semifinals
 QA – qualified for Final A
 QB – qualified for Final B

Final B
 PEN – penalty

Final A
The final A was held at 10:37.

References

 
Mixed NOC team relay